Ben Lomond, just north of Ogden, Utah, is a peak in the northern portion of the Wasatch Mountains. A popular trail passes over its summit (elevation ), accessible from four different trailheads to the north, south, and east.

It is often referred to by locals as Ben Lomond Peak, Mt. Ben Lomond, and Ben Lomond Mountain. The usage Mount Ben Lomond is technically a redundancy as the prefix Ben, which is found in front of many Scottish mountains including Ben Lomond after which this mountain was named, actually means mount - Scottish mountains whose name begins Ben are never preceded by Mount. The USGS has it labeled as Ben Lomond on maps.

Ben Lomond stands out along the Wasatch Front because the mountain range appears to run east and west along the Wasatch Range, while most mountains appear to run south and north. Northwest of Willard Peak is Inspiration Point. A dirt road travels  from Mantua, Utah to Inspiration Point. The road is usually not passable until July due to deep snow that resists melting due to the area's northern exposure. Atop Inspiration Point on a clear day, one can see Salt Lake City to the south, Willard Bay and the Great Salt Lake to the west, and the city of Logan, Utah to the northeast.

From Inspiration Peak one can hike or bike to the summit of Ben Lomond, and then continue east to a trailhead on North Ogden Pass. The trail is listed as one of the top mountain bike rides in Utah.

Ben Lomond was named after the mountain Ben Lomond in the Scottish Highlands. Mary Wilson Montgomery, an early settler, thought the mountain range resembled the Munro.

According to some sources, the Paramount Pictures logo, known as Majestic Mountain, was modeled after Ben Lomond. It is said that William W. Hodkinson, the co-founder of Paramount and a native of the Ogden area, initially drew the image on a napkin during a meeting in 1914.

References

External links 

 

Mountains of Utah
Mountains of Weber County, Utah
Wasatch Range